Kottbusser Tor is a Berlin U-Bahn station located on lines U1, U3, and U8. Many Berliners use the affectionate term Kotti (see Berlin dialect).

It is located in central Kreuzberg. The area has a bad reputation for the relatively high, mainly drug-related crime rate, instances of which have recently become quite rare in most other parts of the district. The original Kottbusser Tor was a southern city gate of Berlin; the road through the gate led via the Neukölln suburb to the town of Cottbus.

Trivia - K and missing h (Cotbusser Thor) rely to a language reform at begin of 20th century. See e.g. Stralauer T(h)or, or Cölln and Neukölln.

History
The station on the first U-Bahn line from Potsdamer Platz to Stralauer Tor was opened on 18 February 1902 on a viaduct above Skalitzer Straße. When the U8 was built in 1926, a new two-level station was constructed  westwards to allow both lines to meet in one location, and the original station was demolished.

It was directly hit on 26 February 1945.

Gallery

References

External links

U1 (Berlin U-Bahn) stations
U3 (Berlin U-Bahn) stations
U8 (Berlin U-Bahn) stations
Buildings and structures in Friedrichshain-Kreuzberg
Railway stations in Germany opened in 1902